Britannia is a suburb of Bacup in the Rossendale borough of Lancashire, England. It lies on the course of two major roads and has a school and a nature reserve. Rochdale is to the south. Inchfield Moor in West Yorkshire is to the east.

Britannia railway station was on the former Rochdale to Bacup Line. Britannia Quarries was a source of employment.

References

External links
History of Britannia
Britannia County Primary School

Geography of the Borough of Rossendale